Captured Anthems for an Empty Bathtub is an album by KC Accidental, self-released in 1998 and re-released in 2003 on Noise Factory Records.

Track listing
All songs by Kevin Drew and Charles Spearin.

"Nancy and the Girdle Boy" - 5:00
"Something for Chicago" - 2:13
"Anorexic He-Man" - 6:42
"Save the Last Breath" - 9:00
"Kev's Message for Charlie" - 4:10
"Tired Hands" - 12:25
"Instrumental Died in the Bathtub and Took the Daydreams With It" - 8:53
"Residential Love Song" - 4:56
"Silverfish Eyelashes" - 8:45
"Ruined in ‘84" - 3:11
"Them (Pop Song #3333)" - 7:12
"Is And Of The" - 12:43

References

1998 debut albums
KC Accidental albums